Sinem Kobal (born 14 August 1987) is a Turkish television and film actress.

Career
At the age of thirteen, She started her acting career in the sitcom Dadı which adaptation of "The Nanny" as Dilara Giritli. She has starred in many films and television series. It is fantasy child series Selena, Küçük Sırlar Turkish version of Gossip girl, Lise Defteri, Gönül İşleri and Analar ve Anneler. She starred in  films Romantik Komedi, and Romantik Komedi 2: Bekarlığa Veda with Engin Altan Düzyatan.
She has appeared in many television commercials in Turkey, including Gencturkcell and Bingo.

Personal life
Kobal's father was a civil engineer. Both of her parents are from Pazar, Rize. She has a brother named Kerem. At the age of four years, Sinem Kobal began her ballet training and continued for eight years. Kobal was a successful student and played volleyball, winning second prize in a competition. In addition, she won the first prize in a step aerobics competition. She received her high school diploma from the Royal Academy. 
She later studied Art Management and Performing Arts at Beykent University.

Kobal began dating Turkish footballer Arda Turan, who was playing for Galatasaray S.K. at that time and the Turkish national team as a left winger, in August 2009. They got engaged in January 2010 and split up in late 2013. Her ex boyfriend is İbrahim Çelikkol. On 14 May 2016, she married actor Kenan İmirzalıoğlu. The couple's first child, a daughter named Lalin, was born in October 2020. Their second daughter, named Leyla, was born in May 2022.

Filmography

Host
Şahane Pazar

References

1987 births
Living people
Turkish television actresses
Turkish film actresses
People from Pazar, Rize
Beykent University alumni
Turkish people of Hemshin descent